The men's super heavyweight (+91 kilograms) event at the 2002 Asian Games took place from 6 to 13 October 2002 at Masan Gymnasium, Masan, South Korea.

Schedule
All times are Korea Standard Time (UTC+09:00)

Results 
Legend
RSCI — Won by referee stop contest injury
RSCO — Won by referee stop contest outclassed

References

External links
Official website

92